The Greater Kansas City Suburban Conference (GKCSC) is a high school athletic conference comprising large to mid-size high schools located in the greater Kansas City, Missouri metro area. The conference members are located in Buchanan, Cass, Clay, Jackson, and Platte counties.

Members
The GKCSC is divided into sub-conferences, based on school size, and is re-structured on a regular basis to account for changes in enrollment.  As of the 2021-22 school year, there are four conferences, with gold being the largest schools, and red, white and blue conferences in descending order of enrollment, with changes announced for 2022-23.

Blue Conference

Gold Conference

Red Conference

White Conference

References

Missouri high school athletic conferences
High school sports conferences and leagues in the United States